Pike Township is one of the sixteen townships of Brown County, Ohio, United States. The 2010 census found 4,243 people in the township.

Geography
Located in the western part of the county, it borders the following townships:
Sterling Township - north, west of Green Township
Green Township - north, east of Sterling Township
Clay Township, Highland County - northeast corner
Washington Township - east
Scott Township - southeast
Clark Township - south
Tate Township, Clermont County - southwest corner
Williamsburg Township, Clermont County - west

Part of the village of Mount Orab is located in northern Pike Township.

Name and history
It is one of eight Pike Townships statewide.

Pike Township was established in 1823 from land given by Clark Township.

Government
The township is governed by a three-member board of trustees, who are elected in November of odd-numbered years to a four-year term beginning on the following January 1. Two are elected in the year after the presidential election and one is elected in the year before it. There is also an elected township fiscal officer, who serves a four-year term beginning on April 1 of the year after the election, which is held in November of the year before the presidential election. Vacancies in the fiscal officership or on the board of trustees are filled by the remaining trustees.

References

External links
County website

Townships in Brown County, Ohio
Townships in Ohio
1823 establishments in Ohio
Populated places established in 1823